is a district located in Okinawa Prefecture, Japan.  Modern translation of Shimajiri means "Butt of the island" which may refer to its southerly position on the island of Okinawa.  Compare this to Kunigami District, Okinawa.

However, there are hundreds of geographic references throughout Japan and even into the northern Kuriles using "shiri", to approximate the Ainu word shir, meaning island.  Despite Okinawa being so far south, historically Jōmon culture was dominant as on the mainland, and words likely have survived, though their original meanings have long been lost or modified.

As of 2020, the district has an estimated population of 105,230 and the density of 447.98 persons per km2. The total area is 234.9 km2.

The district also includes Kume Island, the islands of Iheya and Izena, the Kerama Islands, the Aguni Islands, and the Daitō Islands.

Towns and villages
Haebaru Town
Kumejima Town
Yaese Town
Yonabaru Town
Aguni Village
Iheya Village
Izena Village
Kitadaitō Village
Minamidaitō Village
Tokashiki Village
Tonaki Village
Zamami Village

Mergers
On April 1, 2002 the villages of Gushikawa and Nakazato merged to form the new town of Kumejima.
On January 1, 2006 the town of Kochinda, and the village of Gushikami merged to form the new town of Yaese.
On January 1, 2006 the town of Sashiki, and the villages of Chinen, Ōzato and Tamagusuku merged to form the new city of Nanjō.

Transportation
The following airports are located in Shimajiri District and serve various islands:
 Aguni Airport (Aguni)
 Kerama Airport (Zamami)
 Minami-Daito Airport (Minamidaito)

Naha Airport in Naha serves Shimajiri District areas in or near Okinawa Island.

Districts in Okinawa Prefecture